Tim Harrington has been the lead singer of New York indie rock band Les Savy Fav since they formed while together at Rhode Island School of Design (RISD) in 1995. He is notable for his energetic stage performances which often include multiple changes of clothing and performing in his underwear. He describes his style as "acting entirely by my own desire and what moves me. I've always felt like the only real people I'm particularly trying to entertain are the rest of the guys in the band and myself". He fronted a video series called "Beardo" on Pitchfork Media.

Harrington has also been a professional designer, illustrator, and fine artist since 1996, creating a range of "bummer postcards" and illustrations, including the sleeve art for Les Savy Fav albums. He launched a line of textiles and patterned products with his wife Anna called Deadly Squire. In May 2013  HarperCollins' Balzer & Bray published his interactive children's picture book called "This Little Piggy", which was described as a "humorous, fresh take on the nursery rhyme ‘This Little Piggy,’ featuring drumming, dancing, and superhero toes,”.

References 

Living people
American pop rock singers
Place of birth missing (living people)
Year of birth missing (living people)
American indie rock musicians
American male singers
Rhode Island School of Design alumni
Rhode Island School of Design alumni in music